Theofilos Xenidis (born March 10, 1966), better known as Phil X, is a Canadian musician, singer and songwriter. Since 2013, he has played lead guitar with Bon Jovi and officially replaced former lead guitarist Richie Sambora in 2016.

Career

Early bands and session work (1982–2010)
In 1982, Xenidis formed the hard rock-heavy metal band Sidinex (naming it after himself, the moniker being his last name spelled backwards) with singer Todd Farhood, bassist Kevin Gingrinch and drummer Scott Masterson. The band released only one EP in 1985, Forever Young, before changing name to Flip City in 1987 and disbanding soon after. An opportunity in Xenidis' career came when he was asked in 1990 to tour with Randy Coven, whom he met through Aldo Nova; in 1991, he toured the US with Aldo Nova. From 1992 to 1993 he played with Triumph, recording Edge of Excess and touring with them.

In 1994, Xenidis collaborated with Terry Brown, Doug Varty, Rob Kennedy and others to form a short lived band, The Bushdoctors, in Mississauga, Ontario. They recorded one album, a self-titled debut, now out of print. Also in 1994 he played a guitar solo for Our Lady Peace's song “Denied” from the album Naveed. Phil X was guitarist for US power pop band Powder alongside vocalist and then-wife Ninette Terhart. The band released three albums between 2002 and 2008.

Bon Jovi (2011–present)

In 2011, Phil X substituted for Bon Jovi's lead guitarist Richie Sambora, who missed 13 dates after entering rehab, and later filled in for Sambora on the US and Europe leg of the 2013 tour after Sambora left the band suddenly due to personal reasons. It was a mutual friend between Phil X and Jon Bon Jovi, Arman Ghasemi, who recommended to Jon Bon Jovi to use Phil X as a substitute.

In mid-2013 he filled in for Sambora during a number of dates of the Because We Can tour, including their only Italian date in Milan, the entire British leg of the tour including the Isle of Wight Festival, Hyde Park BST dates, the South African leg, the South American leg, and the Australian leg. In 2016, Phil X became an official member in the band along with bass guitarist Hugh McDonald and also features as guitarist for the band on their single "This House Is Not for Sale" on the album of the same name as well as their latest studio effort Bon Jovi: 2020. In 2019, Phil X was inducted into the Mississauga Music Walk of Fame, which recognizes notable people with musical talent that have their roots in the Ontario city.

Personal life
Phil X was born to Greek-Canadian parents and grew up in Mississauga, Ontario, raised in the Erindale subdivision. Phil was previously married to Ninette Terhart. In 2013, Phil married Lindy Green and has two children with her.

Equipment

Guitars
Phil X has used many guitars during his session and live work. He prefers bridge pickups and often removes the neck pickup from his personal guitars for added vibration, clarity and harmonics. For humorous effect, he will usually place an action figure and fan grille in the pickup cavity. He also favors P-90 pickups due to their tonal flexibility; their tone can be cleaned up on an overdriven amp by simply lowering the volume on the guitar.

His most notable guitar is his ESP LTD Viper, which he refers to as the "sticker guitar". This guitar originally had a Seymour Duncan JB pickup and later a Gibson P-94, but it has since been replaced with an Arcane PX-100.

In 2012, Phil X received a signature guitar from Yamaha, in 2015 followed the release of a signature XG model made by Framus. Phil invented the "Flip Stick", a specially modified replacement for the usual whammy bar on Floyd-Rose-equipped guitars. He endorses Cleartone Treated Guitar Strings and Everly Star Picks as well. 
His demonstrations of rare and vintage guitars have had over 30 million views on the frettedamericana YouTube channel.

In 2019, Phil X became a Gibson artist.

Amplification
Phil X also uses Friedman amplification. He has his own signature amplifier, the Friedman X.

Pickups
Phil X has four custom pickups which he designed in conjunction with pickup manufacturer Arcane, Inc. They are available for sale on his official website:
 PX-90: A P-90 pickup wound to Phil X's specs. It is his preferred pickup and is used in a majority of his guitars.
 PX-100: The same pickup as the PX-90, but made in a humbucker case as a drop-in replacement for humbucker equipped guitars.
 PX-8: A humbucker wound to vintage specs, but uses Alnico 8 magnets for extra output.
 PX-SUPER 8: Also uses Alnico 8 magnets, but is wound hotter for high-gain use.

Discography
Phil X is a prolific session guitarist, having played on albums by Tommy Lee, Methods of Mayhem, Avril Lavigne, Kelly Clarkson, Orianthi, Rob Zombie, Chris Daughtry, Alice Cooper, Thousand Foot Krutch and many others. He wrote the song "Tired" and also played guitar on Tommy Lee's Tommyland: The Ride album. He has appeared with Tommy Lee and Bon Jovi on Ellen and The Tonight Show with Jay Leno. Phil X was featured in the "making of" bonus features for the movie Josie and the Pussycats. He acted as a music coach for the film and taught the young actresses to appear as if they were actually playing their instruments. The following is a list of Phil X's discography as a band member, apart from his session work.

with Triumph
 Edge of Excess (1992)

with Powder

 Sonic Machine (2002)
 Powder (2005)
 Nothing (2008)

with Phil X & The Drills
 Kick Your Ass in 17 Minutes. (2009)
 We Bring the Rock N Roll (2011)
 We Play Instruments N Sh!t (2012)
 Stupid Good Lookings Vol.1 (2019)

with Bon Jovi
 This House Is Not for Sale (2016)
2020 (2020)

Session work
The following is a complete official list of the rest of Phil X's work.

 Nice Place to Visit (1988) by Frozen Ghost
 Two Rooms: Celebrating the Songs of Elton John & Bernie Taupin (1991)
 Shake Your Spirit (1992) by Frozen Ghost
 Naveed (1994) by Our Lady Peace 
 Methods of Mayhem (1999) by Methods of Mayhem
 Brutal Planet (2000) by Alice Cooper
 Movement in Still Life (1999) by BT
 Music from and Inspired by M:I-2 (2000) 
 I Get Wet (2001) by Andrew W.K.
 The Sinister Urge (2001) by Rob Zombie
 Never a Dull Moment (2002) by Tommy Lee
 Emotional Technology (2003) by BT 
 House of 1000 Corpses - Original Motion Picture Soundtrack (2003)
 We're a Happy Family: A Tribute to Ramones (2003) 
 Under My Skin (2004) by Avril Lavigne 
 Day of Fire (2004) by Day of Fire
 Breakaway (2004) by Kelly Clarkson 
 The Art of Breaking (2005) by Thousand Foot Krutch
 Tommyland: The Ride (2005) by Tommy Lee
 Daughtry (2006) by Daughtry
 The Day Has Come (2006) by Cheyenne Kimball 
 Devils & Angels (2007) by Mêlée
 The Flame in All of Us (2007) by Thousand Foot Krutch
 Worlds Collide (2007) by Apocalyptica 
 The Stewart Copeland Anthology (2007) by Stewart Copeland 
 Gavin DeGraw (2008) by Gavin DeGraw
 Scars & Souvenirs (2008) by Theory of a Deadman 
 Patience (2008) by Nick Lachey
 Halestorm (2009) by Halestorm 
 Believe (2009) by Orianthi 
 Last Train Home (2009) by Ryan Star
 Leave This Town (2009) by Daughtry 
 Scream (2009) by Chris Cornell 
 All I Ever Wanted (2009) by Kelly Clarkson 
 Just Like You (2009) by Allison Iraheta 
 For Your Entertainment (2009) by Adam Lambert 
 Sunday Love (2012) by Fefe Dobson 
 EvoLucie (2018) by Lucie (band) 
 "Work Hard, Rock Hard" (2021) by Kurt Deimer

References

External links

An Interview with Phil X

Bon Jovi members
Living people
Canadian people of Greek descent
Musicians from Toronto
Musicians from Mississauga
1966 births
Canadian heavy metal guitarists
Canadian male guitarists
21st-century Canadian guitarists
20th-century Canadian guitarists
Canadian hard rock musicians